The Aruban Liberal Organization (Organisacion Liberal Arubiano, OLA) is a liberal political party in Aruba. 
At the last elections for the Estates, 28 September 2001, the party won 5.7% of popular votes and 1 out of 21 seats. On 23 September 2005, the party won only 4% of the popular vote and lost its seat.

See also
Contributions to liberal theory
Liberal democracy
Liberalism
Liberalism worldwide
List of liberal parties

Liberal parties in the Netherlands
Political parties in Aruba